Uppunda  (ಉಪ್ಪುಂದ) is a large village in Byndoor Taluk with west coast of the village on the Arabian sea in South India.  The nearest city with an airport is Mangalore which is about 119 kilo-meters away. The town is reachable by water and road from Mangalore.  Nearest railway station Byndoor Mookambika Road(BYNR) railway station. It is located in the Byndoor taluk of Udupi district in Karnataka.

Before 1951 Uppunda was a part of the larger Madras state within the British East India Company empire and was annexed Karnataka in free republic India. Majority of people in town speak Kundagannada dialect of Kannada language and Konkani.

Uppunda is also home to one of the largest temple Shree Durgaparameshwari Temple Every year thousands of people gather to celebrate "KODI HABBA" during the winter months of November KARTHIKA or December. MARGASHIRSHA , which involves Utsava the temple deity on a huge chariot, also known as Ratha-Utsava ie: Rathotsava or Ratha-Yatra in some parts of India. There are also a dozen other temples within the village such as Raghavendra Swami Matha, Venkataramana Temple, Moodu Ganapathi Temple, Shiva Temple.

Village has a few primary and middle schools with one high school and a pre-university college with most of the teaching is done in either English or Kannada. Uppunda has an average literacy rate and some students drop out of school each year to work at the local fisheries or to support harvesting the local farms.

The village has mere two banks branch of Karnataka Bank and Canara Bank. The village does not have a hospital, but has several private clinics that offer medical help ranging from first aid to dentistry. There are well known pathology laboratories like Durga Clinical laboratory etc., which provides best clinical services like blood test etc.

Other places around the village that's worth visiting are  Kolluru Mukambika Temple, Maravante Beach, Someshwara Sunset point (Byndoor).

Activity
Fishing is one of the important activities of the local people.

Demographics
As of 2011 India census, Uppunda had a population of 11073 with 5221 males and 5852 females.

See also
Byndoor
Kundapura
 Udupi
 Districts of Karnataka
 Kollur

References

External links
 http://Udupi.nic.in/

Villages in Udupi district